Eternals (Original Motion Picture Soundtrack) is the film score for the 2021 Marvel Studios film Eternals. The score was composed by Ramin Djawadi, with the soundtrack album being released by Hollywood Records on November 3, 2021.

Background
Ramin Djawadi composed the score for the film, after previously doing so for Marvel Studios' Iron Man (2008). Two songs from the film's soundtrack, "Across the Oceans of Time" and "Eternals Theme", were released as singles on October 22, 2021, while the full album was released on November 3. The final track is performed by Celina Sharma. Additionally, "Time" by Pink Floyd plays at the Marvel Studios' vanity plate leading into the first scene in present time, "Sugarfoot" by Black Joe Lewis & the Honeybears plays during Dane's birthday party, "The End of the World" by Skeeter Davis plays at the scene at Phastos' home where he is tucking his son to bed, and "Feels Like the First Time" by Foreigner plays during the credits following the mid-credits scene.

Track listing
All music composed by Ramin Djawadi, except where otherwise noted.

References

2020s film soundtrack albums
2021 soundtrack albums
Eternals (film)
Marvel Cinematic Universe: Phase Four soundtracks
Ramin Djawadi soundtracks